Flatormenis proxima, known generally as the northern flatid planthopper or mealy flatid planthopper, is a species of flatid planthopper in the family Flatidae.

References

Further reading

External links

 

Insects described in 1851
Flatidae